Suresh Kumar Bhatia (born 1952) is an Indian-born chemical engineer and a professor at the School of Chemical Engineering, University of Queensland. He is known for his studies on porous media and catalytic and non-catalytic solid fluid reactions. He was awarded an ARC Australian Professorial Fellowship (2010–15) and is an elected fellow of the Indian Academy of Sciences (1993), and the Australian Academy of Technological Sciences and Engineering (2010). In 1993, the Council of Scientific and Industrial Research, the Indian government's peak agency for scientific research, awarded him the Shanti Swarup Bhatnagar Prize for Science and Technology, one of the highest Indian science awards, for his contributions to the engineering sciences.

Biography 
Born on 8 September 1952, Bhatia graduated in chemical engineering (BTech) from the Indian Institute of Technology, Kanpur and gained his master's and doctoral degrees at the University of Pennsylvania. Starting his career in the US in the chemical industry, he shifted to university research by joining the University of Florida, where he worked for two years until his move to the Indian Institute of Technology, Mumbai in 1984. He served IIT Mumbai for 12 years, winning the Herdillia Award for Excellence in Basic Research in Chemical Engineering, Indian Institute of Chemical Engineers in 1992. He joined the School of Chemical Engineering at the University of Queensland in 1996, where he is a professor.

Focusing his work on transport and reaction in nanostructured porous media, Bhatia has contributed to the field of catalysis, specifically in vapour-liquid and reaction equilibria in small pores. He elucidated multiphase reactions in catalyst particles by demonstrating the existence and consequence of partial internal wetting states.

He was elected a fellow of the Institution of Chemical Engineers, Australia. He received the ExxonMobil Award for excellence of the Institution of Chemical Engineers in 2009, and the Institution of Chemical Engineers, UK (2008). He served on the ARC's Excellence in Research Australia Panel in 2012, and received the University of Queensland, Vice-Chancellor’s Research Excellence Award (2011).

Selected bibliography

See also 

 Porosity
 Nanoporous materials

References

External links 
 

Recipients of the Shanti Swarup Bhatnagar Award in Engineering Science
1952 births
Indian scientific authors
Indian chemical engineers
Fellows of the Indian Academy of Sciences
Living people
IIT Kanpur alumni
University of Pennsylvania School of Engineering and Applied Science alumni
University of Florida faculty
Academic staff of IIT Bombay
Academic staff of the University of Queensland
Fellows of the Australian Academy of Technological Sciences and Engineering